Gombe State University of Science and Technology, Kumo is a public university that was established in 2017. It is located in Kumo, Gombe State Nigeria.

The University was approved by the National Universities Commission (NUC) as the 2nd State University in Gombe State, making it the 46th State University, 86th Public University and 154th University in Nigeria.

Gombe State Government under the leadership of Governor Muhammadu Inuwa Yahaya signed a historic MoU with Lincoln University College of Malaysia to activate and upgrade the State's University of Science and Technology, Kumo as a centre of academic excellence in March 2022.

Founded in 2017, Gombe State University of Science and Technology is a public higher education institution located in Kumo, Gombe. Officially accredited and/or recognized by the National Universities Commission (NUC) , Nigeria, Gombe State University of Science and Technology (GSUST) is a coeducational higher education institution. Gombe State University of Science and Technology (GSUST) offers courses and programs leading to officially recognized higher education degrees in several areas of study.

List of courses offered in Gombe State University of Science and Technology, Kumo.

 Accountancy / Accounting
 Business Management
 Public Administration
 Christian Religious Studies
 English Language
 History
 Islamic Studies
 Education and Biology
 Education and Chemistry
 Education and Christian Religious Studies
 Education and English Language
 Education and Geography
 Education and Islamic Studies
 Education and Mathematics
 Education and Physics
 Education and History
 Biochemistry
 Biology
 Chemistry
 Botany
 Computer Science
 Geology
 Microbiology
 Mathematics
 Physics
 Statistics
 Zoology
 Economics
 Geography
 Sociology
 Political Science

References 

Technological universities in Nigeria
Public universities in Nigeria
Educational institutions established in 2017
2017 establishments in Nigeria
Education in Gombe State